William or Bill(y) Donovan may refer to:

Sports
Bill Donovan (1876–1923), pitcher and manager in Major League Baseball
Bill Donovan (Boston Braves pitcher) (1916–1997), pitcher in Major League Baseball
Billy Donovan (born 1965), American basketball coach and former player
William F. Donovan (1865–1928), Harvard University coach
William Fitz Donovan (1873–1930), American football player and coach
William Donovan III, American basketball coach

Other
William J. Donovan (1883–1959), American soldier, lawyer, intelligence officer and wartime head of the Office of Strategic Services
William Donovan, owner of the historic Star Lite Motel

See also
William Donovan Joynt (1889–1986), Australian recipient of the Victoria Cross
Donovan Williams (disambiguation)
Donovan (disambiguation)